Events in the year 2017 in Sudan.

Incumbents 
 President: Omar al-Bashir

 Prime Minister: Bakri Hassan Saleh

 Vice President: Bakri Hassan Saleh (first), Hassabu Mohamed Abdalrahman (second)

Events 

 War in Darfur continues
 30 July: establishment of the Province of the Episcopal Church of Sudan

Sport 

 24 January – ?: 2017 Sudan Premier League season
 4–13 August: Sudan at the 2017 World Championships in Athletics

Deaths 
 16 February: Ali Osman, Sudanese expatriate composer and conductor in Egypt (b. 1958)
 12 August: Fatima Ahmed Ibrahim, Sudanese Communist Party member (b. 1933)

References 

 
2010s in Sudan
Years of the 21st century in Sudan
Sudan
Sudan